Georgiann Davis is an associate professor of sociology at the University of New Mexico and author of the book Contesting Intersex: The Dubious Diagnosis. Davis formerly held similar positions at University of Nevada, Las Vegas and Southern Illinois University Edwardsville. Born with Androgen Insensitivity Syndrome, she writes widely on intersex issues and the sociology of diagnosis.

Early life 

In a video for The Interface Project, Davis states how she was born with complete androgen insensitivity syndrome and diagnosed as an adolescent after experiencing abdominal pain. Her testes were removed, but she wasn't told her diagnosis: she was told she had cancer. In an article for Ms. Magazine, she says:

Works

Book

Contesting Intersex: The Dubious Diagnosis by Georgiann Davis examines the history of the U.S. intersex movement, with a focus on the medicalization of intersex bodies and a contested shift in clinical language from intersex to "disorders of sex development". Published by NYU Press, the book has been positively reviewed. Elizabeth Reis comments that Davis's work contains "piercing interviews and astute analysis", while Choice describes he book as a "compelling account of how activists, parents, assorted medical specialists and institutions, and people with intersex traits respond to the diversity of human reproductive development".

Scholarly and other works
Georgiann Davis has written both scholarly articles, and opinion articles for broader audiences. Her scholarly work includes articles on the issues of Preimplantation Genetic Diagnosis (PGD), Olympic sex-testing, and both medical terminology and the medical profession.

In the 2011 article, "'DSD is a Perfectly Fine Term': Reasserting Medical Authority through a Shift in Intersex Terminology", Davis examines the state of medical treatment for intersex traits, following a 2006 Consensus Statement on the Management of Intersex Disorders. She describes how:

Davis's analysis was referenced by a committee of the Senate of Australia in 2013.

In "Out of Bounds? A Critique of the New Policies on Hyperandrogenism in Elite Female Athletes", a collaborative article with Katrina Karkazis, Rebecca Jordan-Young, and Silvia Camporesi, published in 2012 in the American Journal of Bioethics, they argue that a new sex testing policy by the International Association of Athletics Federations will not protect against breaches of privacy, will require athletes to undergo unnecessary treatment in order to compete, and will intensify "gender policing". They recommend that athletes be able to compete in accordance with their legal gender.

In 2013, her article "The Social Costs of Preempting Intersex Traits" was published in the American Journal of Bioethics. She questions the use of Preimplantation Genetic Diagnosis to select against intersex traits, arguing that intersex traits reflect necessary natural diversity; deselection of intersex embryos essentially protects "binary ideologies about sex and its presumed correlation with gender". She describes this as a form of sex eugenics that would "obliterate" an intersex community of individuals leading full and happy lives, a community that forces "society to disentangle sex and gender, and in the process, open up new possibilities for embracing all sorts of human diversity." Further, if de-selection of intersex traits is “morally permissible” due to stigma and poor social outcomes, then "we need to recognize that a major source of the shame and stigma individuals with intersex traits face originates in the medical profession"

Selected bibliography

Scholarly works

Opinion pieces

Academic interests 

Davis is an associate professor of sociology at University of New Mexico, where her academic interests include intersex traits, sex and gender, body and embodiment, and the medical profession.

Advocacy work 

Davis is a former president of the AIS-DSD Support Group and is presently on the board of interACT.

Awards and recognition 

Davis received the 2014 Vaughnie Lindsay New Investigator Award from Southern Illinois University Edwardsville, following her identification "as the most promising new researcher on her campus". She has also received the 2013 Midwest Sociological Society Research Grant. In 2012, she received the Outstanding Thesis Award, University of Illinois at Chicago (UIC). In earlier years she received the 2010 Rue Bucher Memorial Award and the 2010 Brauner Fellowship at UIC. In 2009 she received the Beth B. Hess Scholarship Award from Sociologists for Women in Society.

References

External links 
 

Living people
Intersex academics
Gender studies academics
American women sociologists
Medical sociologists
Bioethicists
University of Nevada, Las Vegas faculty
Intersex rights activists
Intersex and medicine
Intersex rights in the United States
Year of birth missing (living people)
Intersex women
Intersex writers